Ezerets Knoll (‘Ezeretska Mogila’ \e-ze-'rets-ka mo-'gi-la\) is the narrow, mostly ice-covered ridge extending 3.35 km in west-northwest to east-southeast direction, 800 m wide and rising to 1294 m in the west foothills of Bruce Plateau on Graham Coast in Graham Land, Antarctica.  It surmounts Hugi Glacier to the west and its tributary Rickmers Glacier to the northeast.

The knoll is named after the settlements of Ezerets in Northeastern and Southwestern Bulgaria.

Location
British mapping in 1976.

Maps
 Antarctic Digital Database (ADD). Scale 1:250000 topographic map of Antarctica. Scientific Committee on Antarctic Research (SCAR). Since 1993, regularly upgraded and updated.
 Antarctic Digital Database (ADD). Scale 1:250000 topographic map of Antarctica. Scientific Committee on Antarctic Research (SCAR). Since 1993, regularly upgraded and updated.

Notes

References
 Bulgarian Antarctic Gazetteer. Antarctic Place-names Commission. (details in Bulgarian, basic data in English)
 Ezerets Knoll. SCAR Composite Antarctic Gazetteer.

External links
 Ezerets Knoll. Copernix satellite image

Ridges of Graham Land
Bulgaria and the Antarctic
Graham Coast